Mbara (also known as Midjamba, Mitjamba, Ambara, Balgalu, or Bargal), and Yanga (also known as Jangaa, Janggal, Janga, Yangaa, Purkaburra) are mutually intelligible but separate Aboriginal language of Queensland, both now extinct. Glottolog assigns a code to a group level as Mbara-Yanga (mbar1254). Yanga is not to be confused with the Yangga language, a dialect of Biri.

The Mbara and Yanga people were traditionally neighbours, along with the Gugu-Badhun, Yirandali, Wunumara and Ngawun peoples. The expansion of cattle farming and gold rushes in the second half of the nineteenth century affected the habitat of these groups.

According to AUSTLANG, Yanga may be the same as Nyangga language and Ganggalida.

References

Extinct languages of Queensland
Southern Pama languages